Crorema is a genus of moths in the subfamily Lymantriinae. The genus was erected by Francis Walker in 1855.

Species
Some species of this genus are:

References

Lymantriini